Matbali bin Haji Musah is a Malaysian politician from BERSATU. He has been the Member of Parliament for Sipitang since 2022 and was the Member of Sabah State Legislative Assembly for Lumadan from 2018 to 2022.

Politics 
He was the Deputy Chief of UMNO Sipitang division until 2019 when he quitted UMNO to join BERSATU.

Election results

Honours 
  :
  Commander of the Order of Kinabalu (PGDK) – Datuk (2020)

References 

Malaysian politicians
21st-century Malaysian politicians
Malaysian Muslims
Place of birth missing (living people)
Independent politicians in Malaysia
Former United Malays National Organisation politicians
Malaysian United Indigenous Party politicians
Members of the Dewan Rakyat
Members of the Sabah State Legislative Assembly
Malaysian people of Malay descent
Living people
Year of birth missing (living people)
Commanders of the Order of Kinabalu